The Pacific Coast League Hall of Fame is an American baseball hall of fame which honors players, managers, and executives of the Pacific Coast League (PCL). It was created by the Helms Athletic Foundation of Los Angeles in 1942 to honor those individuals who made significant contributions to the league's ideals. The Hall of Fame inducted its first class in 1943. A special Hall of Fame room was set up at Los Angeles' Wrigley Field on June 27, 1943.

After the 1957 death of founder and main supporter Paul Helms and the arrival of Major League Baseball in the PCL's two largest markets, Los Angeles and San Francisco, the Hall went dormant. In 2003, with the Pacific Coast League celebrating its centennial season, the Hall was revived. In its first new induction in 2003, twenty-one pre-1957 inductees were elected. The aim of the PCL's Hall of Fame Committee was to eventually recognize worthy players from before 1957, as well as those who made more recent contributions to the league. As of the last inductions in 2018, 110 individuals were inducted into the Pacific Coast League Hall of Fame. No new members were added in 2019, and the PCL's 2020 season was cancelled due to the COVID-19 pandemic. The league was known as the Triple-A West in 2021 before reverting to the Pacific Coast League name in 2022.

Table key

Inductees

See also

 Baseball awards#Triple-A
 International League Hall of Fame

References

External links
 Official website

Hall
Minor league baseball museums and halls of fame
Minor league baseball trophies and awards
Awards established in 1943
Halls of fame in Texas
Museums in Travis County, Texas
Minor League Baseball lists